Mendicant orders are, primarily, certain Catholic Christian religious orders that have adopted a lifestyle of poverty, traveling, and living in urban areas for purposes of preaching, evangelization, and ministry, especially to the poor. At their foundation these orders rejected the previously established monastic model. This model prescribed living in one stable, isolated community where members worked at a trade and owned property in common, including land, buildings and other wealth. By contrast, the mendicants avoided owning property at all, did not work at a trade, and embraced a poor, often itinerant lifestyle. They depended for their survival on the goodwill of the people to whom they preached.

The term "mendicant" is also used with reference to some non-Christian religions to denote holy persons committed to an ascetic lifestyle, which may include members of religious orders and individual holy persons.

Main mendicant orders 
The Second Council of Lyon (1274) established four main mendicant orders, created in the first half of the 13th century:
 The Franciscans
 The Carmelites (Brothers of the Blessed Virgin Mary of Carmel)
 The Dominicans (Order of Preachers)
 The Augustinians (Hermits of St. Augustine)

Other mendicant orders
The other mendicant orders recognized by the Holy See today are the

Trinitarians – Order of the Most Blessed Trinity, sometimes called the Red Friars, founded 1193.
Mercedarians – Order of the Blessed Virgin Mary of Mercy, founded 1218; and after a reform Discalced Mercedarians.
Servites – Order of Servants of Mary, founded 1233 by the Seven Holy Men of Florence, Italy. The order was suppressed by the Second Council of Lyon in 1272, on the basis of the restrictions in the decree "Ne nimium" of 1215; the suppression was not fully enforced and was subsequently overturned by Pope Benedict XI in his Bull, "Dum levamus", of 11 February 1304.
Minims – Hermits of St. Francis of Paola, founded 1436.
Hospitaller Order of the Brothers of Saint John of God – founded in 1572 by Saint John of God for the care of the sick.
Order of the Poor Clerics Secular of the Mother of God of the Pious Schools (Piarist) - founded in 1617 by Saint Joseph Calasanz takes care of the education for the poor and little children.
Order of Bethlehemite Brothers, founded in Guatemala in 1653 and suppressed in 1820. They were refounded in 1984.

Like the monastic orders, many of the mendicant orders, especially the larger ones, underwent splits and reform efforts, forming offshoots, permanent or otherwise, some of which are mentioned in the lists given above.

Former mendicant orders
Mendicant orders that formerly existed but are now extinct, and orders which for a time were classed as mendicant orders but now no longer are.

Extinct mendicant orders
Ambrosians or Fratres sancti Ambrosii ad Nemus, existed before 1378, suppressed by Pope Innocent X in 1650.
Fraticelli of Monte Malbe, founded at Monte Malbe near Perugia in Italy in the 14th century, by the end of the century they had dispersed.
Hospitallers of San Hipólito (Saint Hippolytus) or Brothers of Charity of de San Hipólito were founded in Mexico and approved by Rome as a mendicant order in 1700. In the 18th century they were absorbed by the Brothers Hospitaller of Saint John of God.
Jesuati, or Clerici apostolici Sancti Hieronymim, Apostolic Clerics of Saint Jerome, founded in 1360, suppressed by Pope Clement IX in 1668.
Saccati or Friars of the Sack (Fratres Saccati), known also variously as Brothers of Penitence and perhaps identical with the Boni Homines, Bonshommes or Bones-homes, whose history is obscure.
Crutched Friars or Fratres Cruciferi (cross-bearing friars) or Crossed Friars, Crouched Friars or Croziers, named after the staff they carried which was surmounted by a crucifix, existed by 1100, suppressed by Pope Alexander VII in 1656.
Scalzetti, founded in the 18th century, suppressed by Pope Pius XI in 1935.

Orders no longer mendicant
Jesuits or Society of Jesus, founded in 1540, and for a time considered a mendicant order, before being classed instead as an Order of Clerics Regular.

See also
Friar
Mendicant
Mendicant monasteries in Mexico
Missionary order
Teaching order

References

External links
Audience of Benedict XVI, 13 January, 2010

 
Ascetics